Cleora inelegans is a moth species in the genus Cleora found in Nigeria.

References

External links 

Endemic fauna of Nigeria
Cleora
Moths described in 1905
Lepidoptera of West Africa
Moths of Africa